AC-12 may refer to:

Vehicles
 Southern Pacific class AC-12, a 1940s American steam locomotive class
 Comte AC-12 Moskito, a 1930s Swiss monoplane
 Aerotécnica AC-12, a 1950s Spanish helicopter

Other uses
 AC-12, an IEC utilization category in electrical engineering
 AC-12, a fictional police anti-corruption unit in Line of Duty, a British television series